The following is a list of United States cities, towns and unincorporated areas (Census Designated Places) in which a majority (over 50%) of the population is African American or Black, according to data from the 2000 Census. This list does not include cities such as Chicago, Illinois or Philadelphia, Pennsylvania in which, according to the 2000 Census, merely a plurality (as opposed to a majority) of the residents are African American. The list below is organized by state and, within each state, by population size. The percentage of each city's population that is African American is listed in parentheses next to the city's name.

National rankings

Places with over 100,000 people
 Detroit (82.70%)
 Jackson, Mississippi (79.40%)
 Miami Gardens, Florida (76.3%)
 Birmingham (73.5%)
 Baltimore (64.3%)
 Memphis (61.4%)
 New Orleans (60.2%)
 Richmond, Virginia (57.2%)
 Flint (56.6%)
 Montgomery (56.6%)
 Savannah (55.0%)
 Augusta (54.7%)
 Cleveland (54.3%)
 Atlanta (54.0%)
 Newark (53.5%)
 St. Louis (51.2%)
 Shreveport (50.8%)
 Portsmouth, Virginia (50.6%)
 Baton Rouge (50.2%)

Places with between 25,000 and 100,000 people
 East St. Louis, Illinois (97.74%)
 East Cleveland, Ohio (93.39%)
 Suitland-Silver Hill, Maryland (93.01%)
 Gary, Indiana (84.8%)
 Albany, Georgia (71.6%)
 Inkster, Michigan (67.5%)
 Mount Vernon, New York (61.3%)
 Wilmington, Delaware (58.0%)
 Southfield, Michigan (54.22%)
 Pontiac, Michigan (52.01%)
 Sumter, South Carolina (48.32%)

Places with fewer than 25,000 people

 Birdsong, Arkansas (70.7%)
 McMullen, Alabama (60%)
 Falcon, Mississippi (99.68%)
 Moore Station, Texas (98.91%)
 Brooklyn, Illinois (98.67%)
 Tollette, Arkansas (98.46%)
 Mound Bayou, Mississippi (98.43%)
 Velda Village Hills, Missouri (98.35%)
 Hayti Heights, Missouri (98.31%)
 Mitchellville, Arkansas (98.19%)
 Coahoma, Mississippi (98.15%)
 Brookdale, South Carolina (98.05%)
 White Hall, Alabama (98.03%)
 Lincoln Heights, Ohio (97.86%)
 Mosses, Alabama (97.82%)
 Winstonville, Mississippi (97.81%)
 Metcalfe, Mississippi (97.57%)
 North Courtland, Alabama (97.50%)
 Princeville, North Carolina (97.45%)
 Uplands Park, Missouri (97.39%)
 Fayette, Mississippi (97.37%)
 Grambling, Louisiana (97.10%)
 Alorton, Illinois (97.09%)
 Memphis, Alabama (96.97%)
 Carmody Hills-Pepper Mill Village, Maryland (96.90%)
 Seat Pleasant, Maryland (96.72%)
 Bucksport, South Carolina (96.60%)
 Kinloch, Missouri (96.44%)
 Neylandville, Texas (96.43%)
 Anthonyville, Arkansas (96.40%)
 Reed, Arkansas (96.36%)
 Wilson City, Missouri (96.36%)
 Jonestown, Coahoma County, Mississippi (96.30%)
 Garysburg, North Carolina (96.09%)
 Velda City, Missouri (96.04%)
 Renova, Mississippi (95.99%)
 Beulah, Mississippi (95.98%)
 Pine Lawn, Missouri (95.96%)
 Tchula, Mississippi (95.93%)
 Gordonville, Alabama (95.91%)
 Ford Heights, Illinois (95.89%)
 Promised Land, South Carolina (95.89%)
 Phoenix, Illinois (95.83%)
 Fairmount Heights, Maryland (95.82%)
 Glenarden, Maryland (95.77%)
 Wilkinson Heights, South Carolina (95.66%)
 Gresham Park (95.57%)
 Tuskegee, Alabama (95.48%)
 Centreville, Illinois (95.46%)
 Hillsdale, Missouri (95.40%)
 East Hodge, Louisiana (95.08%)
 Goodlow, Texas (95.08%)
 Walker Mill, Maryland (94.99%)
 Haywood City, Missouri (94.98%)
 North Tunica, Mississippi (94.90%)
 Beverly Hills, Missouri (94.53%)
 Allport, Arkansas (94.49%)
 Wallace, Louisiana (93.86%)
 Friars Point, Mississippi (93.85%)
 North Lilbourn, Missouri (93.68%)
 Lawnside, New Jersey (93.61%)
 Coral Hills, Maryland (93.56%)
 Prairie View, Texas (93.51%)
 St. Albans, Queens, New York (93.5%)
 Highland Park, Michigan (93.44%)
 Langston, Oklahoma (93.29%)
 Crawford, Mississippi (93.13%)
 Jericho, Arkansas (92.93%)
 Capitol Heights, Maryland (92.85%)
 Yellow Bluff, Alabama (92.82%)
 Springdale, Maryland (92.79%)
 Norwood Court, Missouri (92.74%)
 Hobson City, Alabama (92.71%)
 Gifford, South Carolina (92.70%)
 Largo, Maryland (92.69%)
 Northwoods, Missouri (92.66%)
 Eastover, South Carolina (92.41%)
 Benton Harbor, Michigan (92.40%)
 Howardville, Missouri (92.40%)
 Glendora, Mississippi (92.28%)
 Hillcrest Heights, Maryland (92.18%)
 Carlisle, South Carolina (92.14%)
 Pagedale, Missouri (92.09%)
 Shaw, Mississippi (92.08%)
 Union, Alabama (92.07%)
 Wellston, Missouri (92.07%)
 Greater Landover, Maryland (92.03%)
 East Dunbar, Florida (91.99%)
 Natchez, Louisiana (91.94%)
 Washington Park, Illinois (91.94%)
 College Station, Arkansas (91.78%)
 Macedonia, Alabama (91.75%)
 Killona, Louisiana (91.72%)
 Lake View, Arkansas (91.71%)
 Tangipahoa, Louisiana (91.57%)
 Lisman, Alabama (91.42%)
 East Flatbush, Brooklyn, New York (91.4%)
 Sunset, Arkansas (91.09%)
 Shelby, Mississippi (91.08%)
 Kettering, Maryland (90.62%)
 Lane, South Carolina (90.43%)
 Warrensville Heights, Ohio (90.41%)
 Fairfield, Alabama (90.23%)

Alabama

Places with over 100,000 people
 Birmingham (73.5%)
 Montgomery (56.6%)
 Mobile (50.6%)

Places with between 25,000 and 100,000 people
 Bessemer (69.6%)
 Prichard (84.5%)

Places with fewer than 25,000 people

 Akron (86.5%)
 Aliceville (66.5%)
 Autaugaville (66.0%)
 Beatrice (72.6%)
 Boligee (88.9%)
 Brent (50.0%)
 Brighton (89.1%)
 Brundidge (63.5%)
 Camden (54.2%)
 Camp Hill (84.9%)
 Clayton (64.0%)
 Clio (57.2%)
 Colony (93.5%)
 Dayton (65.0%)
 Demopolis (50.9%)
 Edgewater (61.1%)
 Emelle (93.6%)
 Epes (84.0%)
 Eutaw (66.0%)
 Evergreen (52.8%)
 Fairfield (90.2%)
 Five Points (52.1%)
 Forkland (89.2%)	
 Fort Deposit (68.2%)
 Franklin (56.4%)
 Geiger (70.2%)
 Georgiana (61.8%)
 Goodwater (73.3%)
 Gordon (74.0%)
 Gordonville (95.9%)
 Greensboro (60.9%)
 Hayneville (85.5%)
 Hillsboro (82.2%)
 Hobson City (92.7%)
 Hurtsboro (70.3%)
 La Fayette (67.3%)
 Lanett (53.6%)
 Lipscomb (65.6%)
 Lisman (91.4%)
 Livingston (60.8%)
 Loachapoka (61.2%)
 Macedonia (91.8%)
 McMullen (100.0%)
 Marion (62.5%)
 Memphis (97.0%)
 Midfield (59.5%)
 Midway (88.8%)
 Mosses (97.8%)
 Mount Vernon (53.0%)
 Newbern (77.1%)
 North Courtland (97.5%)
 Oak Hill (64.9%)
 Pickensville (63.0%)
 Ridgeville (79.1%)
 Selma (69.7%)
 Selmont-West Selmont (91.4%)
 Shorter (81.7%)
 Thomaston (50.1%)
 Triana (86.5%)
 Tuskegee (95.5%)
 Union (92.1%)
 Union Springs (74.4%)
 Uniontown (88.2%)
 Vredenburgh (89.0%)
 White Hall (98.0%)
 Yellow Bluff (92.8%)
 York (78.3%)

Arizona

Places with fewer than 25,000 people

 Randolph (87.9%)

Arkansas

Places with between 1000 and 25000 people
 Pine Bluff (65.9%)
 West Memphis, Arkansas (55.9%)

Places with fewer than 25,000 people

 Allport (94.5%)
 Altheimer (87.9%)
 Anthonyville (96.4%)
 Birdsong (70.7%)
 Bluff City (71.5%)
 Blytheville (56.0%)
 Bradley (52.4%)
 Carthage (82.8%)
 Chidester (62.4%)
 College Station (91.8%)
 Cotton Plant (74.1%)
 Dermott (73.3%)
 Dumas (60.0%)
 Earle (75.2%)
 Edmondson (71.2%)
 Elaine (58.2%)
 Eudora (84.5%)
 Forrest City (60.9%)
 Fredonia (Biscoe) (58.2%)
 Garland (69.9%)
 Gilmore (79.1%)
 Gould (78.0%)
 Grady (65.8%)
 Gum Springs (55.2%)
 Harrell (56.3%)
 Haynes (85.1%)
 Helena (67.9%)
 Hensley (64.7%)
 Holly Grove (72.6%)
 Hughes (67.8%)
 Jennette (87.9%)
 Jericho (92.9%)
 LaGrange (56.6%)
 Lake View (91.7%)
 Lake Village (56.2%)
 Luxora (56.0%)
 Madison (89.0%)
 Marianna (74.1%)
 Marvell (58.1%)
 McAlmont (70.5%)
 McNeil (58.3%)
 Menifee (84.6%)
 Mitchellville (98.2%)
 Montrose (71.9%)
 Osceola (51.0%)
 Parkdale (66.8%)
 Parkin (68.5%)
 Perla (63.5%)
 Reed (96.4%)
 Rondo (70.0%)
 Rosston (57.7%)
 Stamps (54.5%)
 Strong (53.6%)
 Sunset (91.1%)
 Sweet Home (74.0%)
 Tollette (98.5%)
 Turrell (78.8%)
 Twin Groves (72.1%)
 Wabbaseka (84.2%)
 Waldo (58.7%)
 Washington (61.5%)
 West Helena (65.7%)
 Widener (67.2%)
 Wilmar (71.8%)
 Wilmot (75.2%)
 Winchester (64.9%)
 Woodson (73.9%)
 Wrightsville (74.6%)

California

Places with between 25,000 and 100,000 people
 Westmont (58.0%)

Places with fewer than 25,000 people
 View Park-Windsor Hills (88.0%)
 Ladera Heights (70.8%)
 West Athens (65.1%)
 West Rancho Dominguez (61.9%)

Connecticut

Places with fewer than 25,000 people
 Bloomfield (54.0%)
 Blue Hills (neighborhood of Bloomfield) (83.1%)

Delaware

Places with between 25,000 and 100,000 people
 Wilmington (56.4%)

District of Columbia

Places with over 100,000 people
In 2011 Washington's black population slipped below 50 percent according to the Brookings Institution.

Florida

Places with over 100,000 people
 Miami Gardens (76.3%)

Places with between 25,000 and 100,000 people
 Lauderdale Lakes (67.74%)
 Lauderhill (58.77%)
 North Miami (58.9%)
 Pine Hills (67.6%)
 Riviera Beach (65.9%)

Places with fewer than 25,000 people

 Belle Glade (56.3%)
 Belle Glade Camp (69.6%)
 Boulevard Gardens (94.3%)
 Brownsville (74.7%)
 Campbellton (64.8%)
 Century (56.1%)
 Charleston Park (74.8%)
 Chattahoochee (51.5%)
 Cypress Quarters (58.0%)
 DeLand Southwest (69.6%)
 East Williston (80.4%)
 Eatonville (84.5%)
 El Portal (50.1%)
 Florida City (52.4%)
 Fort Pierce North (70.6%)
 Franklin Park (97.9%)
 Fremd Village-Padgett Island (92.1%)
 Gladeview (75.2%)
 Golden Glades (72.8%)
 Goulding (61.8%)
 Goulds (55.2%)
 Greenville (70.7%)
 Gretna (83.8%)
 Harlem (95.8%)
 Havana (53.6%)
 Homestead Base (55.4%)
 Ives Estates (50.0%)
 Jacob City (90.4%)
 Jasper (50.8%)
 Lake Park (55.0%)
 Lamont (58.4%)
 Limestone Creek (61.8%)
 Lloyd (52.1%)
 Madison (66.0%)
 Mangonia Park (83.1%)
 Midway, Gadsden County (86.0%)
 Midway, Seminole County (84.9%)
 Monticello (54.2%)
 Naranja (57.5%)
 Opa-locka (65.8%)
 Pahokee (56.1%)
 Pembroke Park (55.3%)
 Pinewood (75.3%)
 Progress Village (51.7%)
 Quincy (64.4%)
 Raleigh (55.2%)
 Richmond Heights (72.1%)
 Ridgecrest (67.9%)
 Roosevelt Gardens (96.5%)
 South Apopka (64.1%)
 South Bay (65.0%)
 Tangelo Park (83.7%)
 Tildenville (78.3%)
 Washington Park (94.9%)
 West Park (57.9%)
 West Perrine (62.7%)
 West Little River (57.2%)
 Westview (69.5%)

Georgia

Places with over 100,000 people
 Atlanta (55.0%)
Augusta (54.3%)
 Columbus (54.7%)
Macon (67.34%)

 Savannah (55.0%)

South Fulton (91.8)

Places with between 25,000 and 100,000 people
 Albany (71.6%)
 Candler-McAfee (95.2%)

 East Point (78.2%)
 Redan (91.3%)
Stonecrest (92.6)
 Valdosta (51.1%)

Places with fewer than 25,000 people

 Abbeville (58.4%)
 Alamo (52.6%)
 Alapaha (62.8%)
 Americus (58.3%)
 Arlington (69.9%)
 Ashburn (65.2%)
 Baconton (59.8%)
 Bainbridge (50.3%)
 Bartow (59.6%)
 Belvedere Park (82.4%)
 Blakely (60.0%)
 Boston (67.6%)
 Bronwood (65.7%)
 Broxton (50.4%)
 Brunswick (59.8%)
 Buena Vista (63.4%)
 Byromville (51.6%)
 Cairo (51.3%)
 Camak (53.3%)
 Camilla (65.2%)
 Clarkston (55.7%)
 Coleman (61.7%)
 College Park (81.8%)
 Conley (52.9%)
 Cordele (65.0%)
 Crawfordville (57.0%)
 Culloden (70.9%)
 Cuthbert (74.2%)
 Damascus (63.5%)
 Danville (51.2%)
 Davisboro (61.3%)
 Dawson (77.3%)
 De Soto (65.9%)
 Donalsonville (58.7%)
 Dooling (66.9%)
 Dublin (51.4%)
 Eatonton (59.3%)
 Edison (67.7%)
 Experiment (52.6%)
 Flovilla (51.5%)
 Folkston (51.5%)
 Forsyth (57.6%)
 Fort Gaines (67.9%)
 Fort Valley (74.7%)
 Geneva (52.6%)
 Georgetown (Quitman County) (60.0%)
 Gordon (51.6%)
 Greensboro (62.0%)
 Greenville (73.2%)
 Gresham Park (95.6%)
 Harrison (79.4%)
 Helena (54.2%)
 Hilltop (87.8%)
 Hiltonia (69.8%)
 Ideal (66.2%)
 Irwinton (57.1%)
 Jeffersonville (62.4%)
 Junction City (60.3%)
 Keysville (62.2%)
 Lincoln Park (95.0%)
 Lithonia (79.6%)
 Louisville (65.9%)
 Lumber City (51.4%)
 Lumpkin (70.4%)
 Luthersville (51.9%)
 Manassas (59.0%)
 Marshallville (78.4%)
 McIntyre (57.5%)
 Meigs (66.8%)
 Midville (66.7%)
 Midway-Hardwick (72.6%)
 Millen (59.3%)
 Montezuma (69.8%)
 Monticello (53.5%)
 Morgan (66.5%)
 Morven (52.1%)
 Moultrie (50.2%)
 Newton (53.9%)
 Norwood (62.5%)
 Ocilla (59.4%)
 Oglethorpe (70.3%)
 Oliver (50.6%)
 Panthersville (96.3%)
 Pelham (56.1%)
 Phillipsburg (94.5%)
 Pineview (62.8%)
 Plains (59.8%)
 Quitman (66.4%)
 Reynolds (50.6%)
 Riceboro (88.7%)
 Richland (62.5%)
 Riverdale (67.4%)
 Rochelle (52.8%)
 Salem (96.8%)
 Sandersville (59.0%)
 Sardis (55.3%)
 Sharon (71.4%)
 Shellman (68.9%)
 Siloam (73.1%)
 Smithville (70.3%)
 Soperton (51.8%)
 Sparta (83.7%)
 Stone Mountain (69.2%)
 Sylvester (60.0%)
 Talbotton (77.8%)
 Tennille (56.9%)
 Thomasville (55.4%)
 Thomson (56.3%)
 Toomsboro (53.7%)
 Twin City (53.6%)
 Unadilla (62.1%)
 Union City (69.3%)
 Unionville (97.0%)
 Vienna (66.9%)
 Wadley (77.1%)
 Walthourville (55.1%)
 Warrenton (69.4%)
 Warwick (61.2%)
 Washington (60.8%)
 Waycross (53.5%)
 Waynesboro (62.6%)
 West Point (57.8%)
 Woodbury (56.5%)
 Woodland (77.8%)
 Woodville (69.5%)
 Wrens (65.2%)
 Wrightsville (53.5%)

Illinois

Places with between 25,000 and 100,000 people
 Calumet City (52.9%)
 Dolton (82.4%)
 East St. Louis (97.7%)
 Harvey (79.6%)
 Maywood (82.7%)

Places with fewer than 25,000 people

 Alorton (97.1%)
 Baldwin (58.9%)
 Bellwood (81.6%)
 Broadview (73.1%)
 Brooklyn (98.7%)
 Burnham (54.2%)
 Cairo (61.7%)
 Calumet Park (82.9%)
 Centreville (95.8%)
 Country Club Hills (81.8%)
 Dixmoor (57.1%)
 Dolton (82.3%)
 Fairmont (53.6%)
 Ford Heights (95.9%)
 Hazel Crest (76.1%)
 Hopkins Park (92.3%)
 Markham (78.8%)
 Matteson (62.3%)
 Mounds (60.6%)
 Oak Grove (57.7%)
 Olympia Fields (52.1%)
 Phoenix (93.8%)
 Pulaski (70.8%)
 Richton Park (60.0%)
 Riverdale (86.3%)
 Robbins (95.3%)
 Royal Lakes (80.5%)
 South Holland (50.9%)
 Sun River Terrace (88.3%)
 University Park (83.3%)
 Venice (93.6%)
 Washington Park (91.9%)

Indiana

Places with between 25,000 and 100,000 people
 Gary (84.8%)

Kentucky

Places with fewer than 25,000 people
 Newburg (58.1%)
 Poplar Hills (55.3%)
 Cayce (98.3%)

Louisiana

Places with over 100,000 people
 New Orleans (60.2%)
 Baton Rouge (50.2%)
 Shreveport (50.8%)

Places with between 25,000 and 100,000 people
 Alexandria (54.8%)
 Monroe (61.1%)

Places with fewer than 25,000 people

 Amite City (51.8%)
 Arcadia (60.6%)
 Baker (52.4%)
 Baldwin (64.5%)
 Bastrop (64.5%)
 Belle Rose (59.8%)
 Bonita (55.5%)
 Boutte (64.1%)
 Boyce (74.4%)
 Brownfields (51.8%)
 Bunkie (50.3%)
 Campti (74.5%)
 Cheneyville (65.7%)
 Clarence (74.03%)
 Clayton (67.3%)
 Clinton (58.3%)
 Colfax (67.81%)
 Coushatta (65.4%)
 Cullen (84.9%)
 Delhi (56.8%)
 Donaldsonville (69.1%)
 East Hodge (95.1%)
 Edgard (94.8%)
 Epps (63.1%)
 Farmerville (63.5%)
 Fenton (52.4%)
 Ferriday (74.9%)
 Franklin (50.0%)
 Franklinton (51.9%)
 Gardere (70.9%)
 Garyville (52.43%)
 Gibsland (82.8%)
 Grambling (97.1%)
 Grand Coteau (67.7%)
 Hahnville (50.9%)
 Harrisonburg (54.8%)
 Homer (61.3%)
 Jackson (52.3%)
 Jeanerette (59.7%)
 Jonesville (59.2%)
 Kentwood (64.85%)
 Killona (91.7%)
 Lake Providence (79.5%)
 Lecompte (74.3%)
 Lucky (69.3%)
 Mansfield (64.3%)
 Mansura (60.3%)
 Maringouin (79.4%)
 Marion (54.1%)
 Merrydale (90.2%)
 Minden (52.2%)
 Monticello (63.8%)
 Napoleonville (69.8%)
 Natchez (91.9%)
 Natchitoches (53.0%)
 New Roads (59.3%)
 New Sarpy (51.6%)
 Newellton (64.7%)
 North Vacherie (75.4%)
 Opelousas (69.1%)
 Palmetto (58.5%)
 Pioneer (52.6%)
 Port Allen (54.0%)
 Powhatan (78.7%)
 Rayville (67.3%)
 Reserve (53.9%)
 Richwood (88.2%)
 Ringgold (55.3%)
 Roseland (65.0%)
 Sicily Island (54.5%)
 South Mansfield (73.9%)
 St. Gabriel (72.0%)
 St. Joseph (68.6%)
 St. Martinville (62.8%)
 Sunset (52.4%)
 Supreme (84.4%)
 Tallulah (74.8%)
 Tangipahoa (91.6%)
 Ville Platte (58.7%)
 Waggaman (54.4%)
 Wallace (93.9%)
 Washington (56.3%)
 Waterproof (87.4%)
 West Ferriday (57.6%)
 White Castle (76.8%)
 Wilson (79.8%)
 Winnsboro (58.5%)
 Woodmere (65.8%)

Maryland

Places with over 100,000 people
 Baltimore (64.3%)
 Prince George's County (64.4%)

Places with between 25,000 and 100,000 people

 Chillum (62.7%)
 Clinton (73.7%)
 Lochearn (78.4%)
 Milford Mill (79.1%)
 Oxon Hill-Glassmanor (86.7%)
 Owings Mills (51%)
 Randallstown (72.1%)
 Suitland-Silver Hill (93.0%)
 Waldorf (53.4%)
 Woodlawn, Baltimore County (51.5%)

Places with fewer than 25,000 people

 Bladensburg (70.9%)
 Camp Springs (74.3%)
 Capitol Heights (92.9%)
 Carmody Hills-Pepper Mill Village (96.9%)
 Cheverly (56.8%)
 Coral Hills (93.7%)
 Cottage City (54.8%)
 District Heights (88.0%)
 Eagle Harbor (65.5%)
 Fairmount Heights (95.8%)
 Forest Heights (79.1%)
 Forestville (85.8%)
 Fort Washington (67.2%)
 Friendly (77.7%)
 Glenarden (95.8%)
 Goddard (53.3%)
 Greater Landover (92.0%)
 Greater Upper Marlboro (75.5%)
 Highland Beach (70.2%)
 Hillcrest Heights (93.2%)
 Jessup (67.7%)
 Kettering (90.6%)
 Lake Arbor (88.7%)
 Lanham-Seabrook (63.6%)
 Landover (92.0%)
 Landover Hills (64.2%)
 Largo (92.7%)
 Marlow Heights (88.5%)
 Marlton (55.5%)
 Mitchellville (78.5%)
 Morningside (51.3%)
 Mount Rainier (62.1%)
 New Carrollton (67.5%)
 North Brentwood (82.1%)
 Princess Anne (62.9%)
 Rosaryville (59.6%)
 Seat Pleasant (96.7%)
 Springdale (92.8%)
 Stockton (60.8%)
 Temple Hills (85.0%)
 Walker Mill (95.0%)
 Woodlawn, Prince George's County (72.3%)
 Woodmore (64.9%)

Michigan

Places with over 100,000 people
 Detroit (82.7%)
 Flint (53.3%)

Places with between 25,000 and 100,000 people
 Southfield (54.22%)
 Pontiac (52.01%)
 Inkster (67.5%)

Places with fewer than 25,000 people
 Benton Harbor (92.4%)
 Benton Heights (65.6%)
 Benton Charter Township (51.9%)
 Buena Vista (69.3%)
 Buena Vista Charter Township (55.6%)
 Highland Park (93.4%)
 Muskegon Heights (77.77%)

Mississippi

Places with over 100,000 people
 Jackson (70.6%)

Places with between 25,000 and 100,000 people
 Columbus (54.4%)
 Greenville (69.6%)
 Meridian (54.4%)
 Vicksburg (60.4%)
 Hattiesburg (52.8%)

Places with fewer than 25,000 people

 Aberdeen (60.2%)
 Alligator (77.3%)
 Anguilla (77.0%)
 Arcola (95.0%)
 Artesia (79.3%)
 Beauregard (53.6%)
 Belzoni (68.1%)
 Benoit (76.3%)
 Beulah (96.0%)
 Bolton (66.8%)
 Brookhaven (50.9%)
 Brooksville (79.6%)
 Bude (55.1%)
 Canton (80.3%)
 Cary (64.4%)
 Centreville (67.4%)
 Charleston (59.7%)
 Clarksdale (68.5%)
 Coahoma (98.2%)
 Coffeeville (54.5%)
 Coldwater (69.7%)
 Collins (52.4%)
 Como (71.8%)
 Crawford (93.1%)
 Crenshaw (71.5%)
 Crosby (71.9%)
 Crystal Springs (55.8%)
 Cruger (74.2%)
 De Kalb (50.3%)
 Derma (57.7%)
 Doddsville (67.6%)
 Drew (73.6%)
 Duck Hill (63.3%)
 Duncan (77.5%)
 Durant (70.2%)
 Edwards (78.9%)
 Falcon (99.7%)
 Fayette (97.4%)
 Forest (50.9%)
 Friars Point (93.9%)
 Glendora (92.3%)
 Gloster (55.0%)
 Goodman (65.8%)
 Greenville (75.9%)
 Greenwood (65.4%)
 Gunnison (86.7%)
 Hazlehurst (68.6%)
 Heidelberg (73.3%)
 Hickory (55.1%)
 Hollandale (83.2%)
 Holly Springs (76.2%)
 Indianola (73.4%)
 Inverness (59.4%)
 Isola (63.7%)
 Itta Bena (81.3%)
 Jonestown, Coahoma County (96.3%)
 Kilmichael (53.4%)
 Lake (55.2%)
 Lambert (82.8%)
 Laurel (55.0%)
 Leland (67.0%)
 Lexington (67.3%)
 Louise (54.3%)
 Louisville (52.5%)
 Lula (77.3%)
 Lumberton (53.6%)
 Maben (57.9%)
 McComb (58.4%)
 Macon (67.3%)
 Magnolia (53.8%)
 Marks (64.7%)
 Mayersville (88.1%)
 Merigold (56.9%)
 Metcalfe (97.6%)
 Moorhead (79.0%)
 Morgan City (83.3%)
 Moss Point (70.6%)
 Mound Bayou (98.4%)
 Mount Olive (52.0%)
 Natchez (54.5%)
 Newton (54.7%)
 North Tunica (94.9%)
 Oakland (75.9%)
 Okolona (59.6%)
 Pace (82.7%)
 Pickens (87.7%)
 Port Gibson (80.0%)
 Renova (96.0%)
 Rolling Fork (69.2%)
 Rosedale (82.0%)
 Roxie (58.9%)
 Ruleville (80.8%)
 Sardis (56.4%)
 Schlater (60.6%)
 Scooba (54.9%)
 Shannon (54.2%)
 Shaw (92.1%)
 Shelby (91.1%)
 Shubuta (73.9%)
 Shuqualak (69.6%)
 Sidon (83.3%)
 Silver City (78.3%)
 Sledge (76.0%)
 State Line (56.9%)
 Summit (66.2%)
 Sunflower (71.3%)
 Tchula (95.9%)
 Terry (50.5%)
 Tutwiler (87.3%)
 Utica (66.4%)
 Vaiden (71.1%)
 Verona (57.7%)
 Waynesboro (57.3%)
 Webb (61.3%)
 Weir (53.7%)
 West Point (56.2%)
 Winona (50.7%)
 Winstonville (97.8%)
 Woodville (74.6%)
 Yazoo City (69.7%)

Missouri

Places with over 100,000 people
 St. Louis (51.2%)

Places with fewer than 25,000 people

 Bel-Ridge (79.7%)
 Berkeley (76.7%)
 Beverly Hills (94.5%)
 Black Jack (71.3%)
 Castle Point (88.7%)
 Cool Valley (76.1%)
 Country Club Hills (81.0%)
 Dellwood (58.2%)
 Ferguson (52.4%)
 Flordell Hills (82.1%)
 Glen Echo Park (88.0%)
 Greendale (64.4%)
 Hanley Hills (76.7%)
 Hayti Heights (98.3%)
 Haywood City (95.0%)
 Hillsdale (95.4%)
 Homestown (89.0%)
 Howardville (92.4%)
 Jennings (78.6%)
 Kinloch (96.4%)
 Moline Acres (85.5%)
 Normandy (66.7%)
 Northwoods (92.7%)
 North Lilbourn (93.7%)
 Norwood Court (92.7%)
 Pagedale (92.1%)
 Pasadena Hills (67.4%)
 Pasadena Park (53.4%)
 Penermon (84.0%)
 Pine Lawn (95.7%)
 Pinhook (87.5%)
 Spanish Lake (54.8%)
 Riverview (69.9%)
 Uplands Park (97.4%)
 Velda City (96.0%)
 Velda Village Hills (98.3%)
 Vinita Park (61.7%)
 Vinita Terrace (73.6%)
 Wellston (92.1%)
 Wilson City (96.4%)

New Jersey

Places with over 100,000 people
 Newark (53.5%)

Places with between 25,000 and 100,000 people
 Trenton (42.24%)
 Camden (53.4%)
 East Orange (89.5%)
 Irvington (81.7%)
 Orange (71.8%)
 Plainfield (61.3%)
 Trenton (52.1%)
 Willingboro Township (66.7%)

Places with fewer than 25,000 people
 Asbury Park (67.1%)
 Chesilhurst (56.0%)
 Lawnside (93.6%)
 Pleasantville (57.7%)
 Roselle (51.3%)
 Salem (56.8%)
 Hillside (53.2%)

New York

Places with between 25,000 and 100,000 people
 Hempstead (52.5%)
 Mount Vernon (59.6%)

Places with fewer than 25,000 people
 Hillcrest (51.1%)
 Lakeview (85.0%)
 North Amityville (68.7%)
 Roosevelt (79.2%)
 South Floral Park (59.1%)
 Uniondale (55.5%)
 Wyandanch (77.7%)
 Gordon Heights (62.1%)
 Fairview, Westchester County, New York (73.09%)

North Carolina

Places with between 25,000 and 100,000 people
 Goldsboro (52.2%)
 Rocky Mount (61.3%)

Places with fewer than 25,000 people

 Ahoskie (58.9%)
 Ansonville (76.4%)
 Belhaven (60.7%)
 Bethel (58.1%)
 Bolton (63.8%)
 Bowmore (57.9%)
 Brogden (56.9%)
 Brunswick (55.0%)
 Chadbourn (53.5%)
 Cofield (80.7%)
 Columbia (52.3%)
 Conetoe (63.6%)
 East Arcadia (92.2%)
 East Spencer (85.8%)
 Edenton (55.2%)
 Elizabeth City (56.6%)
 Elm City (53.9%)
 Enfield (79.3%)
 Fair Bluff (59.3%)
 Fairmont (58.7%)
 Farmville (50.1%)
 Fountain (50.5%)
 Fremont (50.7%)
 Garysburg (96.1%)
 Hamilton (53.3%)
 Hassell (62.5%)
 Henderson (59.2%)
 Hobgood (52.2%)
 Kelford (65.3%)
 Kingstown (92.8%)
 Kinston (62.7%)
 Lewiston Woodville (66.7%)
 Light Oak (82.2%)
 Maxton (64.1%)
 Middleburg (63.6%)
 Morven (76.9%)
 Mount Olive (54.3%)
 Navassa (86.6%)
 Northwest (71.8%)
 Oxford (51.4%)
 Parmele (85.9%)
 Pinetops (57.2%)
 Plymouth (63.1%)
 Polkton (56.3%)
 Princeville (97.5%)
 Rich Square (55.9%)
 Robersonville (61.5%)
 Roper (75.2%)
 Rowland (68.0%)
 Scotland Neck (68.0%)
 Seaboard (71.2%)
 Sharpsburg (58.7%)
 Silver City (94.6%)
 South Weldon (84.5%)
 Spring Lake (51.1%)
 Wadesboro (56.4%)
 Washington (50.5%)
 Weldon (62.7%)
 Whitakers (58.3%)
 Williamston (57.5%)
 Windsor (53.0%)
 Winton (68.0%)

Ohio

Places with over 100,000 people
 Cleveland (51.0%)

Places with between 25,000 and 100,000 people
 East Cleveland (93.4%)
 Trotwood (58.3%)

Places with fewer than 25,000 people

 Bedford Heights (67.4%)
 Forest Park (56.3%)
 Fort McKinley (53.2%)
 Golf Manor (62.9%)
 Highland Hills (65.1%)
 Lincoln Heights (97.9%)
 Maplewood Park (58.3%)
 North Randall (71.7%)
 Oakwood (56.2%)
 Silverton (50.3%)
 Urbancrest (58.0%)
 Warrensville Heights (90.4%)
 Wilberforce (84.2%)
 Woodlawn (68.4%)

Oklahoma

Places with fewer than 25,000 people

 Arcadia (55.6%)
 Boley (54.7%)
 Boynton (55.1%)
 Clearview (75.0%)
 Forest Park (72.1%)
 Fort Coffee (62.9%)
 Grayson (61.9%)
 Langston (93.3%)
 Meridian, Logan County (83.3%)
 Redbird (87.6%)
 Rentiesville (64.7%)
 Spencer (51.8%)
 Summit (84.1%)
 Taft (85.4%)
 Tatums (78.5%)

Pennsylvania

Places with between 25,000 and 100,000 people
 Chester (75.7%)
 Harrisburg (54.8%)

Places with fewer than 25,000 people
 Braddock (66.5%)
 Chester Township (73.3%)
 Colwyn (52.1%)
 Darby (60.0%)
 Homestead (51.3%)
 Rankin (69.3%)
 South Coatesville (56.1%)
 Wilkinsburg (66.5%)
 Yeadon (80.8%)

South Carolina

Places with fewer than 25,000 people

 Allendale (80.0%)
 Andrews (60.8%)
 Atlantic Beach (82.1%)
 Awendaw (64.6%)
 Bamberg (53.6%)
 Bennettsville (63.2%)
 Bishopville (65.8%)
 Blackville (75.6%)
 Blenheim (54.7%)
 Bowman (68.9%)
 Brookdale (98.1%)
 Bucksport (96.6%)
 Calhoun Falls (52.7%)
 Carlisle (92.1%)
 Cheraw (52.2%)
 Chester (62.3%)
 Clarks Hill (85.6%)
 Clio (57.1%)
 Cokesbury (72.8%)
 Cope (58.9%)
 Cross Hill (55.6%)
 Darlington (56.0%)
 Denmark (85.9%)
 Dentsville (58.3%)
 Eastover (92.4%)
 Edgefield (59.9%)
 Edisto (69.6%)
 Ehrhardt (56.8%)
 Elko (58.5%)
 Estill (79.4%)
 Fairfax (73.5%)
 Furman (72.4%)
 Gantt (63.1%)
 Georgetown (57.0%)
 Gifford (92.7%)
 Gray Court (54.7%)
 Greeleyville (58.2%)
 Heath Springs (51.0%)
 Holly Hill (50.0%)
 Hollywood (68.8%)
 Johnston (62.6%)
 Judson (56.7%)
 Kingstree (64.7%)
 Kline (57.6%)
 Lake City (71.4%)
 Lancaster Mill (53.3%)
 Lane (90.4%)
 Lynchburg (73.6%)
 Manning (62.4%)
 Marion (66.2%)
 Mayesville (86.0%)
 McCormick (64.1%)
 Mount Carmel (89.9%)
 Mullins (61.6%)
 Orangeburg (67.5%)
 Pamplico (52.5%)
 Pinewood (56.4%)
 Promised Land (95.9%)
 Quinby (56.2%)
 Rembert (75.6%)
 Richburg (74.7%)
 Ridge Spring (63.9%)
 Ridgeville (58.7%)
 Rowesville (60.9%)
 St. Andrews (52.7%)
 St. Matthews (61.5%)
 St. Stephen (58.2%)
 Santee (70.7%)
 Scotia (73.6%)
 Scranton (56.1%)
 Sellers (85.6%)
 Shiloh (58.3%)
 Society Hill (54.0%)
 South Sumter (89.9%)
 Stuckey (79.5%)
 Summerton (57.2%)
 Timmonsville (77.3%)
 Vance (84.6%)
 Varnville (60.3%)
 Wagener (61.5%)
 Waterloo (56.2%)
 Wilkinson Heights (95.7%)
 Willington (82.5%)
 Winnsboro (58.5%)
 Woodford (50.5%)
 Yemassee (55.3%)

Tennessee

Places with over 100,000 people
 Memphis (61.4%)

Places with fewer than 25,000 people
 Bolivar (56.4%)
 Brownsville (60.7%)
 Gallaway (59.0%)
 Gates (53.4%)
 Henning (74.9%)
 Mason (51.5%)
 Stanton (67.8%)
 Whiteville (60.9%)

Texas

Places with between 25,000 and 100,000 people
 DeSoto  (68.6%)
 Cedar Hill  (51.4%)
 Lancaster (68.7%)
 Fresno (59.7%)

Places with fewer than 25,000 people

 Ames (89.3%)
 Barrett (86.6%)
 Browndell (60.7%)
 Calvert (52.4%)
 Cuney (83.5%)
 Domino (63.5%)
 Easton (67.0%)
 Forest Hill (57.1%)
 Goodlow (95.1%)
 Kendleton (79.0%)
 Moore Station (98.9%)
 Neylandville (96.4%)
 Prairie View (93.5%)
 San Augustine (57.9%)
 Seven Oaks (58.0%)
 Scottsville (54.8%)
 Toco (76.4%)

Virginia

Places with over 100,000 people
 Hampton (49.2%)
 Portsmouth (50.6%)
 Richmond (57.2%)

Places with between 25,000 and 100,000 people
 Petersburg (79.0%)

Places with fewer than 25,000 people

 Dendron (51.2%)
 East Highland Park (79.4%)
 Emporia (56.2%)
 Ettrick (75.1%)
 Franklin (52.3%)
 Highland Springs (51.8%)
 Laurel Park (64.4%)
 Lawrenceville (64.6%)
 Nassawadox (54.9%)
 Rushmere (62.1%)
 Sandy Level (73.3%)
 Wakefield (51.3%)
 Waverly (61.8%)

West Virginia

Places with fewer than 25,000 people
 Keystone (72.9%)
 Kimball (63.2%)
 Northfork (53.9%)

See also
 List of U.S. cities with large African-American populations—over 30%, ranked by percentage
 List of African American neighborhoods
 Lists of U.S. cities with non-white majority populations
 List of U.S. counties with African American majority populations
 List of U.S. communities with African-American majority populations in 2010
 List of U.S. communities with Hispanic- or Latino-majority populations in the 2000 census
 List of U.S. states and territories by African-American population
 List of West Indian communities in the United States

References 

African American
African American-related lists